Hot Creek could refer to one of the following places:

United States
Hot Creek (Mono County)
Hot Creek (Modoc County)
Hot Creek Range
Hot Creek (Siskiyou County)